Southside Story 2: International is a New Zealand compilation album released by Dawn Raid Entertainment in 2001.

History
Southside Story 2: International was released in June 2001 through Dawn Raid Entertainment as well as King Distribution. Since the release of the first compilation in 2000, Dawn Raid had expanded into a clothing business, opened a streetwear store and a barbershop.

Around this time the founders of Dawn Raid Entertainment Brotha D & Y.D.N.A had begun taking trips overseas to America to investigate the music scene, it was in this environment that the new album was created. With connections made in LA and N.Y,  Dawn Raid licensed tracks from Jymini, hooked in Canadian star Kardinal Offishall, and spent a lot of time establishing the services of underground New York artists such as Ghetto Rustlaz, Prince Domonique and Harlem's own B.A.G.S.

The Deceptikonz debuted their lyrical frenzy on "Elimination" and "Beware", which ended up getting them voted for the best new group at the bFM Awards 2001.

Track listing
Intro - Brotha D
Elimination - Deceptikonz
Where We're Goin - Ghetto Rustlaz
Girlz Pimp 2 - Jymini
2000 Beyond - K.A.O.S
Unstoppable - Ill Semantics
I Know - Lyrical Lord
Connect - DJ Sirvere featuring Mareko and Scribe
MIC T.H.U.G.S - Kardinal Offishall
Bang Bang - Jymini
Southside Souljahz - 275
Runnin Thangs - K.A.O.S
Who Run This - B.A.G.S
Verbal Assault - Ill Semantics
Beware - Deceptikonz
Game Of Death - Prince Domonique

Compilation albums by New Zealand artists
Hip hop albums by New Zealand artists
2001 albums